Thomas Noel Rettig (December 10, 1941 – February 15, 1996) was an American child actor, computer software engineer, and author. He is remembered for portraying the character "Jeff Miller" in the first three seasons of CBS's Lassie television series, from 1954 to 1957, later seen in syndicated re-runs with the title  Jeff's Collie. He also co-starred with another former child actor, Tony Dow, in the mid-1960s television teen soap opera Never Too Young and recorded the song by that title with the group, The TR-4.

Early life and acting career

Rettig was born to a Jewish father, Elias Rettig, and a Christian Italian–American mother, Rosemary Nibali, in Jackson Heights in the Queens borough of New York City. He started his career at the age of six, on tour with Mary Martin in the play Annie Get Your Gun, in which he played Little Jake.

Rettig was selected from among 500 boys for the role of Jeff Miller, to star in the first Lassie television series, between 1954 and 1957. His character was a young farm boy who lived with his widowed mother, Ellen (Jan Clayton), grandfather (George Cleveland), and his beloved collie, Lassie.

In addition to his famous role as Jeff Miller in the Lassie television series on the CBS network, Rettig also appeared in  17 feature films, including So Big, The 5,000 Fingers of Dr. T., written by Dr. Seuss, and River of No Return with Marilyn Monroe and Robert Mitchum. It was his work with a dog in The 5000 Fingers Of Dr. T. that led animal trainer Rudd Weatherwax to urge him to audition for the Lassie role,  for which Weatherwax supplied the collie.

Rettig later told interviewers that he longed for a life as a normal teenager, and after four seasons, he was able to get out of his contract. He was also critical of the treatment and compensation of child actors of his day. He reportedly received no residual payments from his work in the Lassie series, even though it was later very popular in syndication, widely shown under the title Jeff's Collie.

Rettig graduated in 1959 from University High School in Los Angeles. In the same year at the age of 18, he was cast as Pierre in the episode "The Ghost of Lafitte", set in New Orleans, of the ABC western series The Man from Blackhawk, starring Robert Rockwell as a roving insurance investigator. Actress Amanda Randolph was cast in the same episode, as Auntie Cotton.

As a 19-year-old, Rettig had a prominent guest-starring role in the January 1961 Wagon Train episode "Weight of Command". Then in its fourth season on NBC, Wagon Train was the second highest-rated series that year on American network television. The  Rettig played the part of a 16-year-old boy, Billy, who is traveling with his family on the wagon train. Although his father reluctantly allows his son to go on a buffalo hunt with assistant trailmaster Bill Hawks (Terry Wilson), Billy frets that his father doesn't think of him as being a man yet. When the hunters are attacked by a band of renegade Indians, they take refuge in an empty house. Hawks manages to escape, but wagonmaster Seth Adams (Ward Bond) makes the difficult decision not to attempt Billy's rescue, lest the entire wagon train be vulnerable to attack. Hawks, who had promised Billy he would be rescued, is outraged by the decision to abandon the besieged youth to his fate. When Billy manages to survive the Indian attack on his own, he earns his father's respect.

Tommy guest starred in the television series Peter Gunn, as Kevin Daniels in the 1961 episode "I Know It's Murder". He played a young clairvoyant who hires Peter Gunn, Craig Stevens, to prevent the murder of his mother by her new husband Mark Eustis who was played by Hayden Rorke.

From 1965 to 1966, Rettig co-starred with another former child actor, Tony Dow, in the ABC television soap opera for teens, Never Too Young. With the group "The TR-4", he recorded the song by that title on the Velvet Tone label. While he was the TR-4's co-manager, he did not sing with them. Rettig only co-wrote the song in hopes that the TV soap would use it as the series' theme. The record was produced by Joey Vieira, who under the stage name Donald Keeler played Rettig's sidekick Porky on "Lassie". Producers of Never Too Young, however, chose not to use it. Rettig was subsequently cast as Frank in the 1965 episode "The Firebrand", of the NBC education drama series Mr. Novak, which starred James Franciscus.

Post-acting career
As an adult, Rettig preferred to be called "Tom". He found the transition from child star to adult to be difficult, and he had several well-publicized legal entanglements relating to illegal recreational drugs, a conviction for growing marijuana on his farm in 1972, and a cocaine possession charge in 1976, of which he was exonerated. Some years after he left acting, he became a motivational speaker, which—through work on computer mailing lists—led to involvement in the early days of personal computers.

For the last 15 years of his life, Rettig was a well-known database programmer and author. He was an early employee of Ashton-Tate and specialized in (sequentially) dBASE, Clipper, FoxBASE and finally, FoxPro. Rettig moved to Marina del Rey, California in the late 1980s.

Later years and death
Rettig made a guest appearance as a grown-up Jeff Miller in an episode of the television series The New Lassie with Jon Provost, which aired on October 25, 1991. The updated series featured appearances from Lassie veterans Roddy McDowall, who had starred in Lassie Come Home in 1943, the first feature-length Lassie film, and June Lockhart, who had starred in the 1945 sequel film Son of Lassie. She had also co-starred on the television series, portraying Timmy's mother in the years after Rettig and Jan Clayton left the show.  
 
On February 15, 1996, Rettig died of heart failure at age 54. He was cremated at the Inglewood Park mortuary and his ashes were scattered at sea, three miles off Marina del Rey, California, with the ashes of his friend Rusty Hamer in a combined ceremony.

Filmography

References

Bibliography
 Best, Marc. Those Endearing Young Charms: Child Performers of the Screen (South Brunswick and New York: Barnes & Co., 1971), pp. 215–219.
 Dye, David. Child and Youth Actors: Filmography of Their Entire Careers, 1914–1985. Jefferson, NC: McFarland & Co., 1988, pp. 197–198.
 Holmstrom, John. The Moving Picture Boy: An International Encyclopaedia from 1895 to 1995, Norwich, Michael Russell, 1996, pp. 230–231.

External links

 

1941 births
1996 deaths
20th-century American businesspeople
20th-century American male actors
American computer businesspeople
American male child actors
American male film actors
American male television actors
Jewish American male actors
Male Western (genre) film actors
People from Greater Los Angeles
People from Jackson Heights, Queens
People from Marina del Rey, California
University High School (Los Angeles) alumni
20th-century American Jews